Do Re Mi Fa So La Ti Do is a 2008 South Korean film based on the internet novel of the same title by Guiyeoni.  Directed by Kang Geon-hyang (assistant director of Romance of Their Own) and produced by New Crayon Entertainment. The film received 199,151 admissions nationwide.

Synopsis
Based on the internet novel of the same title and written by Guiyeoni, Do Re Mi Fa So La Ti Do is a touching love story with bittersweet elements.

Jung-won wears a funny dragon suit, while working at the amusement park, and pours soda on Eun-gyu, because of his taunts. A short while later, Jung-won finds out that Eun-gyu has moved into the house next to hers.  Eun-gyu now threatens to tell Jung-won's parents that she works part-time at a local mart. To keep Eun-gyu quiet, Jung-won agrees to carry his guitar for a week.

Jung-won then starts to develop feelings for Eun-gyu, who is the lead singer of a band called Do Re Mi Fa So La Ti Do. Eun-gyu also starts to develop similar feelings for Jung-won. The two soon become a couple.

With an odd twist of fate, Jung-won went to the band's rehearsal room and meets a familiar person from her past, a boy named Hee-won.  Their relationship makes everything more complicated. For 10 years, Jung-won and Hee-won were close friends. One day, Jung-won witnessed a hit-and-run and reported the license plate to the police but the driver turned out to be Hee-won's father. Because of that, Hee-won's family broke apart and they stopped talking to each other completely after Hee-won's father was arrested. Hee-won, seeking revenge at Jun-won, told his "friends" to beat her, rendering her crippled. Jung-won is now surprised to learn that her ex-close friend is now best friends with her boyfriend.

Hee-won admits that he still likes his best friend despite what she did and he wants her back. Hee-won makes her choose between him and Eun-gyu by threatening suicide. Jung-won chooses Hee-won, leaving Eun-gyu devastated. He gives her one last chance to come back to him but she breaks his heart again and chooses Hee-won.

A few months later, Jung-won and Hee-won learn that Eun-gyu was in a car accident and was diagnosed with temporary amnesia. Hee-won lets Jung-won go and she spends all her time trying to get Eun-gyu to remember. The last scene is an re-enactment of the band's last show, the one in which Eun-gyu gave her a last chance. The movie ends with him remembering everything and begging Jun-won not to leave him again. She promises she never will. As the final credits roll we see how all of their lives improved.

Cast
Cha Ye-ryun as Yoon Jung Won
Jang Keun-suk as Shin Eun Gyu
Jung Eui-chul as Kang Hee Won
Lim Ju-hwan as Jae Kwang
Han Soo-yeon as band's member
Lee Eon-jeong as Eun Gyu's sister
Park Min-ji as band member
Kim Hye-ok as Jung Won's Mother
Moon Won-joo as Deok-pal

Music

References

External links 
 

2008 films
2000s musical drama films
South Korean rock music films
Films based on South Korean novels
Cinema Service films
2000s Korean-language films
South Korean musical drama films
South Korean romantic drama films
2008 drama films
2000s South Korean films